Gyanendra Shah (born 7 July 1947) is a former monarch who was the last King of Nepal, reigning from 2001 to 2008. As a child, he was briefly king from 1950 to 1951, when his grandfather, Tribhuvan, took political asylum in India with the rest of his family. His second reign began after the 2001 Nepalese royal massacre. Gyanendra Shah  is the first person in the history of Nepal to be king twice and also the last king of the Shah dynasty of Nepal. 

Gyanendra's second reign was marked by constitutional turmoil. His brother King Birendra had established a constitutional monarchy in which he delegated policy to a representative government. The growing insurgency of the Nepalese Civil War during Gyanendra's reign interfered with elections of representatives. After several delays in elections, Gyanendra suspended the constitution and assumed direct authority in February 2005, asserting that it would be a temporary measure to suppress the Maoist insurgency after civil governments had failed to do so. In the face of broad opposition, he restored the previous parliament in April 2006. He was deposed two years later by the first session of the Constituent Assembly, which declared the nation to be the Federal Democratic Republic of Nepal and abolished the 240-year-old Shah dynasty.

Early life and first reign 

Gyanendra was born in the old Narayanhiti Royal Palace, Kathmandu, as the second son of Crown Prince Mahendra and his first wife, Crown Princess Indra. After his birth, his father was told by a court astrologer not to look at his newborn son because it would bring him bad luck, so Gyanendra was sent to live with his grandmother.

In November 1950, during a political plot, both his father and his grandfather King Tribhuvan, along with other royals, fled to India, leaving the infant Prince Gyanendra as the only male member of the royal family in Nepal. He was brought back to the capital Kathmandu by the Prime Minister Mohan Shamsher, who had him declared king on 7 November 1950. Not only was Gyanendra crowned, but coins were issued in his name. The Rana prime minister provided a 300,000 rupee annual budget as expenditure for the king. After opposition to the hereditary rule of the Rana prime ministers from India, a deal was reached in January 1951, and Gyanendra's grandfather King Tribhuvan returned to Nepal and resumed the throne. The actions of the Rana regime to depose his grandfather and place Gyanendra on the throne were internationally recognized.

Gyanendra studied with his elder brother King Birendra at St. Joseph's School, Darjeeling, India; in 1969, he graduated from Tribhuvan University, Kathmandu. He served as the chairman of the Advisory Committee for the Coronation of his brother King Birendra in 1975. He is a keen conservationist and served as chairman of the King Mahendra Trust for Nature Conservation (later known as National Trust for Nature Conservation) from 1982 until his reaccession to the throne in 2001.

Gyanendra married his second cousin Komal Rajya Lakhsmi Devi on 1 May 1970 in Kathmandu. They have two children:
Prince Paras Bir Bikram Shah Dev (born on 30 December 1971).
Princess Prerana Rajya Lakshmi Devi Singh (born on 20 February 1978).

Succession

Gyanendra again assumed the throne after many other royal family members, including King Birendra, were assassinated on 1 June 2001 by Gyanendra's nephew Crown Prince Dipendra, who was titular king for a brief period before succumbing to a self-inflicted gunshot wound. These events and the ensuing investigation proved very controversial. A two-man investigation team appointed by Gyanendra and made up of Keshav Prasad Upadhaya, then-Supreme Court Chief Justice, and Taranath Ranabhat, then-Speaker of the House of Representatives, carried out a week-long investigation. After interviewing more than 100 people—including eyewitnesses, palace officials, guards, and staff—they concluded that Dipendra had indeed carried out the massacre, but they drew no further conclusions. As his nephew lay in a coma, Prince Gyanendra was named regent; but after King Dipendra's death on 4 June 2001, Gyanendra resumed the throne.

Second reign

Early reign
During his early years on the throne, Gyanendra sought to exercise full control over the government, citing the failure of all the political parties to hold an election after the parliament was dissolved. In May 2002, he supported the popularly elected Prime Minister Sher Bahadur Deuba when he dismissed the parliament elected in 1999. In October 2002, he dismissed Deuba and consolidated his power for the first time. During the years 2002 to 2005 he chose and subsequently dismissed three prime ministers for failure to hold elections and bring the rebels to a round table negotiation; he finally dismissed Deuba for the second time and took over as absolute ruler on 1 February 2005, promising that the country would return to normality within 36 months.
His elder brother King Birendra had negotiated a constitutional monarchy during his rule in a delicate manner in which he, as king, played a minor role in government. Thus, Gyanendra's confrontational approach with the established political parties met with widespread censure.

When Gyanendra took complete control for the second time, on 1 February 2005, he dismissed Prime Minister Sher Bahadur Deuba's government for failing to make arrangements for parliamentary elections and being unable to restore peace in the country, which was then in the midst of a civil war led by Maoist insurgents.

Gyanendra promised that "peace and effective democracy" would be restored within three years.
but the period of direct rule was accompanied by repression of dissent. International organizations expressed grave concerns about the safety of journalists, following the king's decision to restrict civil liberties, including freedom of the press, the constitutional protection against censorship and the right against preventive detention.

In April 2006, the seven-party alliance and the then banned CPN Maoist party in an underground manner staged protests and strikes in Kathmandu against King Gyanendra's direct rule. The royal government exercised minimum restraint but declared a curfew to control the deteriorating situation, which was enforced with live firearms and tear gas. After 23 protesters were killed, on 21 April 2006, King Gyanendra announced that he would yield executive authority to a new prime minister chosen by the political parties to oversee the return of democracy. Several party leaders rejected the offer and again demanded that the King call a council to determine the monarchy's future role in politics. An agreement was reached between the parties under the supervision of the Indian ruling Congress that the monarchy would have a place in the new constitution. Girija Prasad Koirala was appointed prime minister in the interim. Girija Prasad, as the main leader, had talks with the King and the agreement for monarchy's position. As such, on 24 April 2006, Gyanendra reinstated the previous parliament in a televised address to the nation.

End of direct rule
The agreement between the parties and Gyanendra under Indian supervision was not honored by the parties. It is widely believed that the then Prime Minister Girija Prasad Koirala was deeply convinced that as long as Gyanendra remained in the power structure, there was always danger to the democratic order in Nepal. On 10 June 2006, the Parliament scrapped the major powers of the king, including his right to veto laws. This ended the idea of a "King in Parliament", and he was reduced to a figurehead, though for a time he continued to offer felicitations and to receive diplomats. According to Article 167 of the constitution, all executive powers as well as those enjoyed by the king in the previous Constitution were now vested in the prime minister. All powers of the 239-year-old monarchy were stripped, making Gyanendra a civilian king.

Prime Minister Koirala, who had previously supported the continuation of the monarchy, said in March 2007 that he thought Gyanendra should step down. In June, Koirala repeated his call for Gyanendra to abdicate in favor of his grandson Prince Hridayendra.

On 23 August 2007 Nepal's transitional government nationalized all the properties Gyanendra inherited from his brother, including the Narayanhiti Royal Palace. The move did not affect the properties he owned before his accession to the throne.

Interim suspension of the monarchy 
It was announced on 24 December 2007 that, following the approval of the Nepalese Parliament, the monarchy would probably be suspended in 2008, as part of a peace deal with Maoist rebels. This was for a bill to amend the constitution to make Nepal a republic.

On 27 May 2008, the meeting decided to give Gyanendra fifteen days to vacate the palace and decided that the first meeting would be held the next day at 11 am; however, it was delayed due to the indecision among the leading parties on power-sharing and the nomination of 26 members of the Constituent Assembly.

On 28 May 2008, the monarchy was officially given no place in the amended constitution of 1990 and was replaced by a republic. This was done by the Constituent Assembly, without a referendum. Gyanendra accepted the decision in the following days. As he was required to leave Narayanhiti, he asked the government to make residential arrangements for him on 1 June, and on 4 June the government decided to give Nagarjuna Palace to Gyanendra.

Gyanendra left the Narayanhiti Palace in Kathmandu on 11 June 2008, moving into the Nagarjuna Palace. His new residence consists of ten buildings including the royal residence Hemanta Bas, three guesthouses (Barsha Bas, Sharad Bas and Grishma Bas), one office secretariat and one staff quarters. Gyanendra and his family moved into the two-storey Hemanta Bas. Following his departure, the Narayanhiti Palace was turned into a museum, while Gyanendra's diamond- and ruby-encrusted Crown and royal scepter, along with all the other crown jewels and royal assets, became government property. The royal family's departure from the palace was reported as a "major symbolic moment in the fall of the Shah dynasty, which had unified Nepal in the 1760s".

Transition to interim republic
Gyanendra, in an interview with foreign reporters published on 9 April 2008, expressed dissatisfaction over the decision made by the interim parliament to abolish the monarchy after the 10 April Constituent Assembly election. The interview was published in Japan's leading newspaper,  Daily Yomiuri. Speaking to a select group of Japanese correspondents at the Narayanhiti Royal Palace on 4 February 2008, Gyanendra said, "[The decision] doesn't reflect the majority view of the people. This isn't a democracy."
However, he conceded that the people do have the right to choose the fate of the monarchy.

Gyanendra also said that law and order in the country was deteriorating, and questioned the interim government's ability to govern the country even after he had accepted the road map of the seven-party alliance. Citing the recent survey which showed 49% of respondents favored the continuation of the monarchy in some form, Gyanendra claimed, "A majority of the people find great meaning in the institution of the monarchy. In all clouds, there is a silver lining. Let us hope."

Gyanendra had broken his closely guarded silence in an interview with a Nepali weekly paper in which he said he remained silent to "let the peace process succeed". On 7 February 2008 the BBC reported Gyanendra as saying to Japanese journalists: "The Nepali people themselves should speak out on where the nation is heading, on the direction it is taking and on why it is becoming chaotic".
He claimed that his attempt on 1 February 2005 was for a good purpose—restoring peace and stability in the country. He said that his attempt was not a success and so the countrymen are suffering at present.

In an interview, Gyanendra's advisor, Bharat Keshar Singh, claimed that the bill passed by the parliament was a bluff. Replying to a question raised regarding the King's silence even after the bill was passed declaring the state a republic, he said that there was nothing for the King to respond to. He claimed that the parliament which declared a republic was reinstated by the King himself and had no authority to dethrone the same King. He claimed that the King was examining the activities of the government and the parliament and was waiting for a suitable time to respond to them. He said that no people would accept the "bill" unless decided by a referendum or elected members in the constituent assembly.

On 15 January 2007 the interim parliament was set up with the Communist Party of Nepal (Maoist) included, and on 1 April 2007, the interim government joined by the Communist Party was formed. On 28 December 2007, the Nepali interim parliament approved a bill for the amendment to the constitution of 1990 promulgated on 15 January 2007, with a clause stating that Nepal would become a federal democratic republic, to be implemented by the first meeting of the Constituent Assembly elections.

In 2020 the RPP-N submitted 2.35 million signatures to the Constituent Assembly demanding a referendum for the fate of the 240-year old monarchy and a Hindu state.

Alleged foreign intervention in the fall of the monarchy 
Senior Journalist P. Kharel told BBC Nepali service in an interview that King Gyanendra lost his throne when he refused to make Nepal "a protectorate like Bhutan". King Gyanendra's Honorary Royal ADC Late Bharat Keshar Simha also expressed the same during an interview with Jibram Bhandari on Sagarmatha TV.

Later life

In an interview with News 24 TV channel in 2012, Gyanendra stated that he would return as the King of Nepal, although he did not state a particular time frame. When asked if he would consider becoming actively involved in politics, he said that he is not a politician. He also dismissed the need for a referendum on bringing the institution of monarchy back into power. He asserted that since the politicians had not asked the people by a referendum to abolish the institution, a referendum to bring him back was not needed.

Gyanendra also stated in the interview with News24 that a written agreement existed between the politicians and himself that the constitutional monarchy would be returned when he gave up his powers to the politicians and restored the Parliament that he had sacked.

On 8 July 2019, the former king's birthday was observed by thousands of Nepalese who marked the occasion by marching to his private residence at Nirmal Niwas Palace. The rally was organized by The Main Civilian Birthday Celebration Committee, however, the former king refused to give audience to the crowd as he didn't celebrate his birthday in public due to the demise of his relatives. Therefore, the visitors wrote birthday wishes on registers kept at the Nirmal Niwas Palace.

In July 2019, the former king summoned acclaimed political analyst Surendra K.C. where the two discussed the current political environment of the nation. In an interview with Nepal Aaja, KC remarked that the former king did not show any active interest to return to the throne or into politics. However, KC did note that the former monarch showed great concerns for the condition of the Nepalese in times of economic turmoil and political suppression.

During a private party at Trisara restaurant in Durbarmarg, a picture taken of the former king dancing caused significant unrest and outcry, most notably from Maoist leader Prachanda and Prime Minister Oli. Critics and citizens alike condemned the remarks of the politicians criticizing the former king's private affairs.

Protest in Myagdi
Soon after news emerged of a ten-day personal visit to Parbat district in 2012, ten political parties of the district organized a corner meeting at Shibalaya Chowk of Kusmabazaar, and decided to protest against Gyanendra's visit. Leaders speaking at the corner assembly called on Gyanendra to stop his visit and also warned that they would obstruct his tour forcibly if he started it. Nevertheless, Gyanendra left for Pokhara. There was no protest on the first day. He walked in the rain through the general public for more than one kilometre. However, the scheduled visit of Gyanendra to Myagdi was cancelled following opposition from different political parties. He had planned to worship at various holy shrines in the district.

COVID-19

On 20 April 2021, the former king and queen tested positive for COVID-19 on their return from India.

Wealth
Despite having all of the properties he inherited from his late brother King Birendra nationalized, the former king still retained all of his personal wealth prior to his enthronement. Having been a businessman, the former king is said to have inherited huge fortunes from his family members and still runs many lucrative businesses through investments and is widely believed to be worth hundreds of millions of dollars. His investment in Soaltee Hotel alone was estimated to be around $100 million in 2008 with a 47% stake.
Furthermore, the former king is reported to have 54% stake in Himalayan Goodricke Tea, 39% stake in Surya Nepal Tobacco, stakes in Annapurna Hotel which he inherited from aunt Princess Helen, large tea plantations in Itahari, and stakes in Himal International Power Corporation, Jyoti spinning mill in Birgunj, Narayanghat brewery, a Toyota and Tata distributorship, Laxmi Rosin Turpentine Pvt Ltd, Bhotekoshi power company, Sipradi Trading Pvt Ltd, Gorkha Lawrie Pvt Ltd, Amaravati Pvt Ltd, an island in the Maldives and oil interests in Nigeria.

Honours 
 National orders
  Sovereign of the Order of Nepal Pratap Bhaskara
  Sovereign of the Order of Ojaswi Rajanya
  Sovereign of the Order of Nepal Taradisha
  Sovereign of the Order of Tri Shakti Patta
  Sovereign of the Order of Gorkha Dakshina Bahu
 Most Glorious Mahendra Chain
 Birendra Chain (29 December 2002)
  King Mahendra Investiture Medal (2 May 1956)
  King Birendra Investiture Medal (24 February 1975)
  Commemorative Silver Jubilee Medal of King Birendra (31 January 1997)

 Foreign orders

:
 King Jigme Singye Investiture Medal (2 June 1974)
:
 Grand Cross of the National Order of Merit, 2 May 1983
:
 Knight Grand Cross Order of Merit of the Federal Republic of Germany, 25 November 1996
:
 Member of the Order of Korean Labour, 1978
:
 Grand Gwanghwa Medal (First Class) of the Order of Diplomatic Service Merit, 1987
:
 Grand Cross of the Order of the House of Orange, 25 April 1967
 Commander of the Order of the Golden Ark, 1987
:
 Nishan-e-Imtiaz, 1970
:
 Member Special Class of Order of King Abdulaziz, 1983
:
 Knight Grand Cross of the Order of Isabella the Catholic, 13 November 1987
:
 Knight Grand Cordon of the Order of the White Elephant, 1979
:
 Knight Grand Cross of the Order of St. Michael and St. George, 1986
:
 Sash of the Order of the Yugoslav Star 1st Rank, 2 February 1974

Ancestry

References

External links

King of Nepal is stoned by crowd. BBC 16 February 2007

Nepal News Feed - News Headlines 

1947 births
Living people
Nepalese anti-communists
Nepalese monarchs
Field marshals
Hindu monarchs
Pretenders
Child monarchs from Asia
Monarchs deposed as children
Tribhuvan University alumni
Honorary Knights Grand Cross of the Order of St Michael and St George
Grand Cross of the Ordre national du Mérite
Grand Crosses of the Order of the House of Orange
Knights Grand Cross of the Order of Isabella the Catholic
Grand Crosses 1st class of the Order of Merit of the Federal Republic of Germany
Recipients of Nishan-e-Imtiaz
Nepalese Hindus
Shah dynasty
Modern child monarchs
Monarchs who abdicated
People of the Nepalese Civil War